A rat trap is a trap designed to catch rats. Designs are often larger variations on mousetraps.

Types of traps

Spring traps for large rodents such as rats or squirrels are powerful enough to break the animal's neck or spine. They may break human fingers as well, whereas an ordinary spring-based mousetrap is very unlikely to break a human finger. Rat spring traps may not be sensitive enough to spring when a mouse takes the bait.

A rat cage trap is a metal cage box-shaped device that is designed primarily to catch rats without killing them. Food bait (not poisoned) is put in the cage trap.  When an animal enters the cage and moves toward the bait, the mechanism triggers and closes a door over the entry point. The animal is caught alive and without injury. The animal can be transported and released elsewhere or subsequently killed.

Glue traps are non-poisonous sticky glue spread over card boards and the like and kept in places rats frequent, which gets them stuck to it when they pass over it.  The rat will subsequently die from dehydration and asphyxiation.  A bait may also be placed on the cardboard to attract the rats.

Another form of non-lethal trap is one where the wires it is constructed of are cut and formed into a funnel shape directed into the body of the cage. This design is usually dome shaped with the funnel at the crown. Rats are extremely flexible and can push through the narrower opening into the cage, but cannot escape due to the ends of the wires poking them in the face. The advantage of this design is that it can catch more than one rat at a setting.

Other types of traps (as shown below) are designed to kill the animal.

Electronic rat traps detect the presence of a rodent via metal plates on the floor of the trap, then deliver a lethal dose of high-voltage electricity stepped up from batteries to several thousand volts. Some brands offer remote indication to tell you when the trap has operated. The Eliminator (South Africa) and Victor (US) are two brands of electronic rat traps.

Glue traps, however, are not considered a humane method of rodent control, especially if the rodent is left to die. They can also harm non-targeted animals. However, they are still commonly used by professionals for insect monitoring in containers that prevent access by rodents. 

Another trap design, often considered more humane, is a self-resetting rat trap like the Goodnature A24. These traps kill rodents with an impact from a CO2-powered piston and are self-resetting.

Gallery

References

External links 

Mousetrap Monday - videos of mouse and rat traps being tested.

Mammal pest control
Pest trapping
Rats
Articles containing video clips